Katakam Sudarshan, commonly known by his nom de guerre, Anand, is a Politburo member of the Communist Party of India (Maoist), a banned Maoist insurgent communist party in India.

Early life and family 
Anand was born at Adilabad in Andhra Pradesh, and pursued education at the government polytechnic college, in Warangal. He has worked as a teacher to financially support his higher education. He married the Adiladab district secretary of CPI (Maoist), Sadhana. She was gunned down by the police force, few years back.

Guerrilla life 
Anand is one of the senior-most cadres of the ultra-leftist political party, and has been leading the ongoing armed struggle from northern Telangana to Dandakaranya, for over 30 years. He is described by Indian police as a "soft spoken" person, an "orthodox" Maoist and a "hardline strategist". He is prominently known for chalking out the policies of the party in the political arena, and upholds that political power grows out of the barrel of a gun.

After the completion of his studies, Anand joined the radical leftists in 1975; and in 1979, he shifted to Chhattisgarh. In the 1980s, he became a member of the Communist Party of India (Marxist-Leninist) People's War (People's War Group), founded by Kondapalli Seetharamaiah. He is famous for his "ruthless guerilla warfare tactics" and has been designated the duty of training the cadres in "guerrilla warfare", and planning "military precision strikes" on the armed forces, in the territory of Chhattisgarh.

He is a Central Military Commission and Politburo member of CPI (Maoist), and is believed to be heading the Eastern Regional Bureau of the party, after Kishenji's elimination in the ongoing Maoist movement in India. He has also worked as the chief of the Central Regional Bureau of the CPI (Maoist).

Responding on a question about the Indian government's "Operation Green Hunt" during an interview, he said to journalists, "We have been in the middle of a cruel, bitter war for several years." In 2010, he told media personnel that out of the 45 members of the Central Committee of the Communist Party of India (Maoist), 8 has been arrested and 22 has been killed by the agencies of the Indian government. He is also reportedly working on the task to attempt stalling the "Operation Green Hunt".

A senior police officer once told Hindustan Times that "Sudarshan is not a pacifist like Azad and was against his party’s initiative to hold talks with the government."

See also 

 Socialism
 Communism
 Marxism
 Leninism
 Marxism-Leninism-Maoism
 Naxalism
 People's war
 New Democratic Revolution
 Radicalism (historical)
 Left-wing politics
 Naxalite-Maoist insurgency
 Anuradha Ghandy
 Azad
 Charu Majumdar
 Ganapathy
 Kobad Ghandy
 Kosa
 Narmada Akka
 Prashant Bose

References

External links 
 International Campaign Against War on the People in India
 People’s War in India: Interview with Comrade Anand of the Communist Party of India (Maoist)

Video
 Man behind the Dantewada attack, NDTV

Anti-revisionists
Communist Party of India (Maoist) politicians
Indian guerrillas
Living people
Naxalite–Maoist insurgency
Year of birth missing (living people)
People from Adilabad district